The 2017–18 Coppa Italia is the 27th edition of the tournament.

Schedule
The rounds of the 2017–18 competition are scheduled as follows:

Round I
The first round ties are scheduled from 29 September to 1 October 2017.

Group A
Tournament will be played at Piscina Goffredo Nannini, Florence.

Group B
Tournament will be played at Piscina Francesco Scudieri, Catania.

Round II
The second round ties are scheduled from 6 to 8 October 2017.

Group C
Tournament will be played at Piscina Gianni Vassallo, Bogliasco.

Group D
Tournament will be played at Centro Natatorio Mompiano, Brescia.

See also
2017–18 Serie A1 (National Championship of Italy)

External links
 Italian Water Polo Federaration

Coppa Italia
Coppa Italia
Coppa Italia Men
Coppa Italia Men